Tariq Mahmood (born 22 April 1985) is a Pakistani cricketer. He played in twenty first-class and eleven List A matches between 2001 and 2010. He made his Twenty20 debut on 27 April 2005, for Sialkot Stallions in the 2004–05 National Twenty20 Cup.

References

External links
 

1985 births
Living people
Pakistani cricketers
Abbottabad cricketers
Khan Research Laboratories cricketers
Sialkot cricketers
Sialkot Stallions cricketers
Cricketers from Gujranwala